Boone Grove is an unincorporated town in Porter County, Indiana, southwest of the city of Valparaiso.

History
In 1881–82, the Chicago and Erie Railroad was built through the township and the post office moved to the current location, along with most of the original community members.

The town witnessed its greatest growth between 1890 and 1910. The Modern Woodmen of America Lodge (1908) at the corner of Main Street and County Road 350 West is a reminder of this period. The Porter Township High School was constructed in 1931 on Main Street at Lucretia Street. Although significantly changed with additions, it remains the township's elementary and middle school.

Schools
The current Boone Grove High School is not located in the community of Boone Grove, but rather in Valparaiso, Indiana, although  outside of that city; County Road 260 South 500 West is the school's postal address. The former high school (which is now operates as Boone Grove Elementary and Middle School) is located in Boone Grove adjacent to a farm.

The high school's track and field team practices behind the former high school. The baseball and softball teams each have a field at the high school; however, there are additional ball fields at the former high school. There are four tennis courts at the high school and none at the former high school.

The Boone Grove school mascot is a Wolf; the sports teams at Boone Grove High School are nicknamed the "Wolves."

The current Boone Grove Middle School has a mixture of children from the Boone Grove Elementary School and the nearby Porter Lakes Elementary School located on County Road 725 West in Hebron.

Boone Grove High School Baseball won the 2018 IHSAA 2A State Championship, beating Southridge High School 5-4 at Victory Field in Indianapolis, June 19th, 2018.

Boone Grove High School Football completed the school's first undefeated regular season in 2019, dominating the Greater South Shore Conference, and compiling a 9-0 record.

References

External links

Unincorporated communities in Indiana
Unincorporated communities in Porter County, Indiana
Populated places established in 1843
1843 establishments in Indiana
Census-designated places in Porter County, Indiana